The list of ship decommissionings in 1906 includes a chronological list of ships decommissioned in 1906.  In cases where no official decommissioning ceremony was held, the date of withdrawal from service may be used instead.


References

See also 

1906
 Ship decommissionings